The following is a list of Major League Baseball players, retired or active. As of the end of the 2011 season, there have been 105 players with a last name that begins with Y who have been on a major league roster at some point.

Y

References

External links
Last Names starting with Y – Baseball-Reference.com
List of Major League Baseball players (Yabu to Yvars) at Baseball Almanac

 Y